"Never Let Me Down Again" is a song by English electronic music band Depeche Mode. It was released as the second single from their sixth studio album, Music for the Masses (1987), on 24 August 1987. It reached No. 22 in the UK, No. 2 in West Germany, and the top-10 in several other European countries such as Sweden and Switzerland. The cover art features fragments of a Soviet map of Russia and Europe, with different fragments used for the different editions of the single.

Composition
Former member Alan Wilder and the other members of the band considered the track an "obvious single" with much potential. They developed it throughout so that dramatic-type elements such as the Led Zeppelin-influenced drum patterns and Martin Gore's distinctive guitar riffs sound in the forefront. The lyrics of the song, starting with the strident vocals of "I'm taking a ride with my best friend", are generally regarded as reflecting drug use, with the track being labelled by NME music journalist Jane Solanas as a "masterpiece" that well conveys the feeling of "drug euphoria". In an 1987 interview, Gore said that the song "has nothing to do with relationships. It's about the concept of fleeing from reality and the evil awakening afterwards. Any kind of fleeing. Drugs, alcohol, or whatever."

The guitar intro of the song on the album was not originally intended, according to producer Bascombe: "the sequencers we were using in those days, that guitar was sampled and it just ran on the count-in over the start of the track but it wasn't supposed to be. We all went, 'That's great' and so that was a happy accident". The coda of "Never Let Me Down Again" references Soft Cell's song "Torch". The main remix version of the track, known as the "Split Mix", came about with direct involvement from the band. Oddly enough, despite the pleasing results from the point of view of the band, that proved to be the last time in decades that a remix came out with their direct involvement.

Live performances
The song became a favourite among fans, especially live. Notable in the 101 video is when Dave Gahan waves his arms in the air toward the end of the song, and the sold-out crowd of 60,000 mimics Gahan's movements. It is now customary at Depeche Mode shows for fans to wave their arms in the air during the coda section of "Never Let Me Down Again", which the German magazine Music Express has termed a "wind in a cornfield" simulation.

During the 1990 World Violation Tour, the band played a different version of the song, known as the "Split Mix", including their massive live performances at the Giants and Dodger Stadiums, which were being broadcast live on MTV.

On 8 November 2001, shortly after their final Exciter Tour concert in Mannheim, Germany, the band played "Never Let Me Down Again" during the MTV Europe Music Awards in Frankfurt, which aired in the US on MTV2.

Remixes
The main 12" remix of "Never Let Me Down Again" is known as the "Split Mix", as stated above, and the nine-and-a-half-minute track featured direct involvement from the band during its creation. In detail, the remix features the regular song, an added intro piece, and a techno-like musical arrangement appended at the end. The arrangement was expanded to the "Aggro Mix" on the 12" B-side, a piece additionally available as a bonus track on the CD and cassette tape versions of Music for the Masses.

The "Split Mix" appears on the album collection Remixes 81–04, a release that came out in October 2004. Another remix of the track, done by the German group Digitalism, came out in 2006 as one of the 'Digital Deluxe Bonus Tracks' found in The Best of Depeche Mode Volume 1 (also being released as a limited double vinyl 12" piece). That remix appears on the band's remix compilation Remixes 2: 81–11 as well. Eric Prydz also remixed the song for this album.

Music videos
There are two music videos for "Never Let Me Down Again", directed by Anton Corbijn. The long version is featured on the Strange video, and uses the "Split Mix" (minus the intro and outro) and during the later EBM portion of the song, Gahan's shoes are shown walking without anyone wearing them, before someone puts them on and wears them to dance. There is also a short video with just the single version of the song, which ends before the animated shoes. The short version appears on The Videos 86>98, the DVD of The Best of Depeche Mode Volume 1 and on Video Singles Collection.

B-sides
There are two B-sides. "Pleasure, Little Treasure" is a short dance track. An extended version called the "Glitter Mix" ends with fragments of vocal recordings that have been reversed and treated with delay effects. Notably, some of these sounds can be heard in the track "Mothers Talk" from the 1985 Tears for Fears album Songs from the Big Chair, which was engineered by Dave Bascombe. The "Glitter Mix" showed up as a bonus track on the CD/Cassette versions of Music for the Masses and in remastered form on the 2006 CD/DVD release.

The rarer B-side is "To Have and To Hold (Spanish Taster)". Martin Gore's original plan for the song sounded a lot like upbeat electropop, but Alan Wilder turned it into the dark wave track it eventually became. While Alan's version was always set to be the final version, Martin wanted his version to be recorded as well. However, not all of the lyrics are sung in the song. It shows up as one of the bonus tracks on the CD/Cassette version of Music for the Masses and is on the CD versions of "Never Let Me Down Again". The regular version of "To Have and To Hold" is one of the main tracks on the Music for the Masses LP.

Notable cover versions
The Smashing Pumpkins recorded a cover of the song and released it as a B-side on their 1994 CD single "Rocket" as well as on the Depeche Mode tribute album For the Masses. Discussing the cover, Martin Gore said he had "always liked" the Pumpkins cover, while Dave Gahan said he "particularly liked it", and even thought it was "a lot better" than the Depeche Mode original.

In popular culture 
The song was featured in the 2023 HBO series The Last of Us. It played during the end of the first episode, "When You're Lost in the Darkness." Craig Mazin, the co-creator of the series, chose the song due to its blend of upbeat sounds and dark lyrics. He felt its title referred to the relationship between Joel and Ellie, and noted it would recur later in the season in a different manner. In the wake of the song being featured on The Last of Us, the amount of streams of "Never Let Me Down Again" tripled overnight. The song returned in the sixth episode, performed by Mazin's daughter Jessica, to demonstrate Ellie feeling let down by Joel.

Track listings
All songs written by Martin Gore.

7": Mute / Bong14 (UK)
"Never Let Me Down Again" – 4:20
"Pleasure, Little Treasure" – 2:52

12": Mute / 12Bong14 (UK)
"Never Let Me Down Again (Split Mix)" – 9:34
"Pleasure, Little Treasure (Glitter Mix)" – 5:34
"Never Let Me Down Again (Aggro Mix)" – 4:53

12": Mute / L12Bong14 (UK)
"Never Let Me Down Again (Tsangarides Mix)" – 4:22 (Remixed by Chris Tsangarides)
"Pleasure, Little Treasure (Join Mix)" – 4:53 (Remixed by John Fryer & Paul Kendall)
"To Have and to Hold (Spanish Taster)" – 2:33

Cassette: Mute / CBong14 (UK)
"Never Let Me Down Again (Split Mix)" – 9:34
"Pleasure, Little Treasure (Glitter Mix)" – 5:34
"Never Let Me Down Again (Aggro Mix)" – 4:53

CD: Mute / CDBong14 (UK)
"Never Let Me Down Again (Split Mix)" – 9:34
"Pleasure, Little Treasure (Join Mix)" – 4:53
"To Have and to Hold (Spanish Taster)" – 2:33
"Never Let Me Down Again (Aggro Mix)" – 4:53

Originally released in Cardsleeve [1987]
Rereleased as 4track CD single in Slim Jewel Case in 1991.

CD: Mute / CDBong14 (UK)
"Never Let Me Down Again" – 4:20
"Pleasure, Little Treasure" – 2:52
"Never Let Me Down Again (Split Mix)" – 9:34
"Pleasure, Little Treasure (Glitter Mix)" – 5:34
"Never Let Me Down Again (Aggro Mix)" – 4:53
"Never Let Me Down Again (Tsangarides Mix)" – 4:22
"Pleasure, Little Treasure (Join Mix)" – 4:53
"To Have and To Hold (Spanish Taster)" – 2:33

The second CD is the 1992 re-release.

Charts

Weekly charts

Year-end charts

See also

1987 in music
Depeche Mode discography
Songs about recreational drug use

References

External links
Single information from the official Depeche Mode web site

1987 songs
1987 singles
Black-and-white music videos
Depeche Mode songs
Music videos directed by Anton Corbijn
Mute Records singles
Number-one singles in Denmark
Song recordings produced by Daniel Miller
Songs about drugs
Songs written by Martin Gore